Mighty Og was a roadside attraction consisting of a  high sculpture of a gorilla from the waist up.  It originally graced a billboard promoting Rawhide City, a tourist attraction in Mandan, North Dakota.   

The statue was auctioned following the Rawhide City bankruptcy. He had intended it as an attraction to his hardware store, but opted not to proceed due to structural concerns. A site was eventually located on Highway 52. The figure shakes its fist at a large hornet above its head to indicate that "even a gorilla can't beat the Hornets", a reference to the local school team.

The structure was destroyed in a strong windstorm sometime before June 2005.

One hypothesis put forth is that these figures distinguish one community from another in an otherwise somewhat featureless landscape.

References

Novelty buildings in North Dakota
Roadside attractions in North Dakota
2005 disestablishments in the United States